Ron Calvin Grandison (born July 6, 1964) is a former basketball player, who attended the University of California, Irvine and the University of New Orleans. He was selected in the fifth round of the 1987 NBA draft, 100th pick overall, by the Denver Nuggets.

Grandison played in the NBA intermittently in all together 4 seasons (1988–1996), for five teams: Boston Celtics, Charlotte Hornets, New York Knicks (two stints), Miami Heat and Atlanta Hawks, averaging 2.4 points per game. He was known primarily as a hard working player and a defensive specialist. Grandison made 4 career three point shots, all as a member of the Miami Heat during the 1995–96 season.  

Grandison and his business partner/wife, Barb Grandison, have scheduled a Grand Opening and Ribbon-Cutting on Sunday, January 5, 2020, for the new, expanded and freshly-rebranded Ronnie Grandison Sports Academy, the training center he opened in 1996 on East Kemper Road in Cincinnati.

References

Cincinnati Business Courier story published on Friday, January 3, 2020 https://www.bizjournals.com/cincinnati/news/2020/01/03/greater-cincinnati-sports-center-debuts-6-million.html?iana=hpmvp_cinci_news_headline

External links
Statistics at basketballreference.com

1964 births
Living people
American expatriate basketball people in the Philippines
American expatriate basketball people in Spain
American men's basketball players
Atlanta Hawks players
Basketball players from Los Angeles
Boston Celtics players
Charlotte Hornets players
Cincinnati Stuff players
Denver Nuggets draft picks
La Crosse Bobcats players
Liga ACB players
Magnolia Hotshots players
Miami Heat players
New Orleans Privateers men's basketball players
New York Knicks players
Omaha Racers players
Philippine Basketball Association imports
Pop Cola Panthers players
Power forwards (basketball)
Rapid City Thrillers players
Rochester Flyers players
Rochester Renegade players
Rockford Lightning players
UC Irvine Anteaters men's basketball players